The 1999 Generali Ladies Linz doubles was the tennis doubles event of the thirteenth edition of the most prestigious tournament in Austria. Alexandra Fusai and Nathalie Tauziat were the two-time defending champions, but they were defeated in the semifinals by Tina Križan and Larisa Neiland.

Irina Spîrlea and Caroline Vis won in the final, defeating Križan and Neiland in straight sets to win their third doubles tournament as a team in the year.

Seeds

Draw

Qualifying

Seeds

Qualifiers
  Amanda Hopmans /  Silvija Talaja

Qualifying draw

References
 ITF doubles results page

Generali Ladies Linz - Doubles